This is a list of events and openings related to amusement parks that occurred in 2011. These various lists are not exhaustive.

Amusement parks

Opening

 Legoland Florida - October 15, replaced the former Cypress Gardens
 Rainbow MagicLand - May 26
 Trans Studio Bandung - June 18

Change of name
 Geauga Lake's Wildwater Kingdom » Wildwater Kingdom
 Walibi World » Walibi Holland

Change of ownership
 Darien Lake - PARC Management » Herschend Family Entertainment
 Elitch Gardens - PARC Management » Herschend Family Entertainment

Birthday

 Beijing Shijingshan Amusement Park - 25th birthday
 California's Great America - 35th birthday
 Walt Disney World Resort - 40th birthday
 Canada Canada's Wonderland - 30th birthday
 Disney California Adventure - 10th birthday
 Dreamworld - 30th birthday
 Lagoon Amusement Park - 125th birthday
 Magic Kingdom - 40th birthday
 Michigan's Adventure - 55th birthday
 Toverland - 10th birthday
 Six Flags Great America - 35th birthday
 Six Flags Magic Mountain - 40th birthday
 Six Flags Over Texas - 50th birthday
 Six Flags St. Louis - 40th birthday
 Australia Sea World - 40th birthday
 Valleyfair - 35th birthday
 Warner Bros. Movie World - 20th birthday
 WhiteWater World - 5th birthday

Closed
 Escape Theme Park - November 26
 Wannado City - January 2
 NASCAR Cafe - May 1
 Storyland
 Yongma Land

Additions

Roller coasters

New

Relocated

Refurbished

Other attractions

New

Closed attractions & roller coasters

Amusement parks in terms of attendance

Worldwide
This section list the top 25 largest amusement parks worldwide in order of annual attendance in 2011.

Poll rankings

Golden Ticket Awards

The 2011 Amusement Today Golden Ticket Awards were held at Holiday World & Splashin' Safari in Santa Claus, Indiana.

Records broken

See also
 List of roller coaster rankings
 :Category:Amusement rides introduced in 2011
 :Category:Roller coasters introduced in 2011
 :Category:Amusement rides that closed in 2011

Notes

References

External links
 Listing of 2011 roller coaster openings at the Roller Coaster DataBase
 Listing of 2011 roller coaster closures at the Roller Coaster DataBase

Amusement parks by year
Amusement parks